Charline Labonté (born October 15, 1982) is a Canadian former professional ice hockey player. Labonté played professionally for the Montreal Stars/Les Canadiennes de Montreal of the Canadian Women's Hockey League. She was a member of the Canada women's national ice hockey team that won three gold medals at the Olympics and two gold medals in the World Championships. She is an alumna of the McGill Martlets hockey program.

Labonté now lives in Montreal, and graduated from McGill University with a degree in Physical Education. Labonté was named to the 2014 Olympic roster for Canada. She would be the winning goaltender for Les Canadiennes de Montreal in the final of the 2017 Clarkson Cup. In September 2017, she retired from Les Canadiennes and the Canadian national hockey team, as the goalie ranking second most all-time in games won (45), shutouts (16), and games played for Canada, with three Olympic gold medals, 2 world championship wins and 6 world silver medals.

Playing career

Hockey Canada
Labonté was one of two goaltenders playing for the Canadian women's hockey team in the 2006 Turin olympics. At the Torino Games, Labonte and Kim St. Pierre allowed a combined two goals in five games played. Labonte logged 180 minutes of ice time and led all goaltenders with a goals against average of 0.33 and a save percentage of .976, respectively. In 2010, she served as the third goaltender for the gold medal winning Canadian women's team. Prior to this she played for the Montreal Axion and Laval Le Mistral, Teams of the National Women's Hockey League. She was awarded Top Goaltender honours at the 2009 world championships.

QMJHL
She was one of the few women to play Major Junior hockey, appearing in 28 games with the Acadie-Bathurst Titan of the Quebec Major Junior Hockey League between 1999 and 2000. Her play for the QMJHL club was featured on a hockey card issued by Upper Deck in their 1999–2000 UD Prospects set (card #54). She competed for Team Quebec at the 1999 Canada Winter Games. She was a member of the Montreal Axion in 2004–05, and one of her teammates was fellow Olympian Gina Kingsbury.

McGill Martlets
With McGill, she competed in five CIS National tournaments. On December 31, 2010, Labonte required only 13 saves to post her 59th career shutout with McGill as the Martlets defeated the nationally ranked fifth overall Alberta Pandas by a 3–0 mark in the final game of the Bisons Holiday Classic tournament at Max Bell Arena. In the game, the Martlets held a 31–13 edge in shots. Gillian Ferrari was credited with the game-winner on the power-play at 5:49 of the first period. Jasmine Sheehan, a fifth-year defender scored the second goal of the game. Logan Murray, a freshman from Calgary, scored the last goal of the contest. In an October 29, 2011 contest against the Montreal Carabins, Ariane Barker scored on Labonte with 71 seconds left in a 3–2 win versus McGill. Labonte took the loss for the Martlets, giving her a 69–2 overall record in her CIS career. It marked the Martlets first loss to a Quebec conference opponent for the first time in 108 games.

Inline hockey
Also a member of the Canada women's national inline hockey team, winning a gold medal at the 2004 FIRS Inline Hockey World Championships, some of her teammates on the roster included fellow Hockey Canada alumnae Meghan Agosta, Amanda Benoit-Wark, Isabelle Chartrand, Cherie Piper and Amy Turek.

Awards and honours

Top Goaltender, 2006 Esso Women's National Hockey Championship Pool A: Charline Labonte 
Top Goaltender, 2009 world championships
2011-12 RSEQ FIRST ALL-STAR TEAM: Charline Labonté
2015 CWHL Goaltender of the Year Award

Career stats

CWHL

Personal life
In June 2014, Labonte publicly came out as a lesbian.

References

External links

 
 
 
 
 
 Player profile on hockey Canada
 Charline Labonté: McGill's golden goalie in McGill reporter, February 21, 2008.
 Charline Labonté, le dernier rempart in Cyberpresse, March 10, 2011. 

1982 births
Living people
Acadie–Bathurst Titan players
Canadian women's ice hockey goaltenders
Canadian women's national inline hockey team players
Clarkson Cup champions
Ice hockey people from Quebec
Ice hockey players at the 2006 Winter Olympics
Ice hockey players at the 2010 Winter Olympics
Ice hockey players at the 2014 Winter Olympics
Lesbian sportswomen
LGBT ice hockey players
Canadian LGBT sportspeople
McGill Martlets ice hockey players
Medalists at the 2006 Winter Olympics
Medalists at the 2010 Winter Olympics
Medalists at the 2014 Winter Olympics
Montreal Axion players
Olympic gold medalists for Canada
Olympic ice hockey players of Canada
Olympic medalists in ice hockey
Sportspeople from Longueuil
Les Canadiennes de Montreal players
21st-century Canadian LGBT people